Bogusław Kaczmarek (born 6 March 1950) is a Polish football manager and former player.

Personal life
Kaczmarek is commemorated by a star at the MOSiR Stadium in Gdańsk. The "Avenue of Stars" commemorates the efforts and success of former players and coaches.

He is the father of manager and former footballer Marcin.

References

External links
 Soccerway profile
 List of honorary citizens of Grodzisk 

1950 births
Living people
Footballers from Łódź
Polish footballers
Lechia Gdańsk players
Polish football managers
Lechia Gdańsk managers
Zawisza Bydgoszcz managers
OKS Stomil Olsztyn managers
GKS Bełchatów managers
GKS Katowice managers
Dyskobolia Grodzisk Wielkopolski managers
Arka Gdynia managers
Polonia Warsaw managers
GKS Tychy managers
Association footballers not categorized by position